The Refugees is a 2015 drama television series created by Ramón Campos, Gema R. Neira, Cristóbal Garrido and Adolfo Valor. The series is a joint production of BBC Worldwide and Atresmedia that premiered on laSexta on 7 May 2015. It shows a rural community faced with millions of refugees from the future seeking shelter in the present.

Overview
Mankind is suffering the biggest exodus in history. Three billion people from the future have travelled to the present to escape from an imminent global disaster: a deadly mutation of a cold virus. All the refugees must obey two rules: they must not talk about the future and they must not contact their families.

The arrival of the refugees takes everyone by surprise, including the Cruz family. The series centres on their story, the story of Samuel, Emma and little Ani. A shift in their existence after the arrival of a mysterious refugee, Alex, who has an incredible mission that will change their lives, and in order to accomplish his mission, he will not hesitate to do whatever there is to be done: including breaking the rules.

Cast
The following is a list of cast members from the series:

Natalia Tena as Emma Oliver
Will Keen as Samuel "Sam" Cruz
David Leon as Alex
Dafne Keen as Ana "Ani" Cruz Oliver
Ken Appledorn as Luis
Jonathan Mellor as Óscar
Charlotte Vega as Sofía
Gillian Apter as Gloria
Morgan Symes as Victor
Benjamin Nathan-Serio as Cristian
Gary Piquer as Hugo
Brendan Price as Félix
Summer Gibbins as Sara
Julius Cotter as Man

Production
The television series is a BBC Worldwide and Atresmedia co-production with Bambú Producciones. Filming began in summer 2014.

Episodes
In Spain, the first and second episodes of The Refugees were broadcast simultaneously the same day on four television channels (Neox, Nova, laSexta and Antena 3) of Atresmedia. The premiere of The Refugees was watched by 4.37 million viewers. The rest of episodes aired on laSexta.

See also
 The 4400 and 4400 -  A ball of light deposits a group of 4400 people who vanished without a trace over the last century, having not aged a single day and with no memory of what happened to them.
 The Crossing - Refugees fleeing a war seek asylum in an American town—but they claim to be from America, 180 years in the future.
 Beforeigners - A "time migration" occurs all over the world, with people from the Stone Age, Viking Age, and the 19th century. Set in Oslo.

References

External links
 

English-language television shows
LaSexta original programming
Post-apocalyptic television series
British time travel television series
2015 Spanish television series debuts
2015 Spanish television series endings
2015 British television series debuts
2015 British television series endings
Television series by Bambú Producciones